is a Japanese talent agency headquartered in Ebisu, Shibuya, Tokyo. It was founded in 1994 and focuses on talent management for newscasters and tarento. The primary talents the agency holds are free announcers, casters and reporters.  The company holds a subsidiary talent agency, Sprout Co.,Ltd, which focuses on talent management for students at a college level. Sprout was formerly a part of cent. Force until 2012, when the agency split to become a subsidiary.

In 2016, the company extended operations to the Kansai region with a new branch for management of Kansai talents.

Notable talents

Tarento/Casters 

 Elina Arai
 Maki Okazoe
 Aiko Kaitou
 Hiromi Kawata (former Yomiuri TV)
 Mitsuyo Kusano (former NHK, TBS)
 Reiko Shiota (former badminton player)
 Aya Shibata (former SKE48)
 Mai Shinuchi (former Nogizaka46)
 Mika Sugisaki (former SBC)
 Junko Yaginuma
 Marie Yanaka

Others 

 Kei Igarashi (basketball player)
 Takashi Usami (association football player)
 Tatsuya Masushima (association football player)
 Mana Iwabuchi (association football player)
 Ayane Kurihara (badminton player)

References

External links 

 cent. Force website

Talent agencies based in Tokyo
Mass media companies established in 1994
Mass media companies based in Tokyo
Entertainment companies of Japan
Japanese companies established in 1994
Japanese talent agencies